James William Frank Batchelor (4 July 1895 – 1951) was an English professional footballer who played in the Football League for Gillingham as an outside left.

Career 
Born in Hoo St Werburgh, Batchelor joined Third Division South club Gillingham from non-League Chatham Town in September 1922. He made three appearances for the club before leaving to join Brentford in 1923.

Career statistics

References

1895 births
English footballers
Gillingham F.C. players
Brentford F.C. players
People from Strood
1951 deaths
Chatham Town F.C. players
Association football outside forwards
English Football League players
People from Hoo St Werburgh